Karim Abdul Razak Tanko (born 18 April 1956) is a Ghanaian football coach and former midfielder. He played for several clubs in the 1970s and 1980s, notably the local club Asante Kotoko and the New York Cosmos in the defunct North American Soccer League (NASL).

Popularly called the "Golden Boy", Razak also played for the Ghana national team, helping it win the 1978 African Cup of Nations. He was named African Footballer of the Year later that year.

Razak, who also played for clubs in the UAE, Egypt and Ivory Coast, was ranked by the Confederation of African Football (CAF) in 2007 as one of the confederation's 30 best footballers of the previous 50 years.

Early life 
Razak was born in Kumasi to Alhaji Abdul Karimu and Hajija Ishatu. He studied at Asem Boy's Elementary School. He started his playing career at local youth team football, before moving to Kumasi Cornerstones in 1972.

Club career 
In 1975, he moved to Ghana's most successful club, Asante Kotoko. After a four-year spell with Kotoko, during which he became a member of the national team and earned the 1978 African Footballer of the Year award, Razak left Ghana in 1979 for the New York Cosmos of the NASL, where he played alongside former World Cup winners Franz Beckenbauer and Carlos Alberto.

In 1981, after spending almost two years at the New York club, the Ghanaian forward decided to return home, signing with his former club Asante Kotoko. After one year, he moved, this time to Al Ain of UAE, where he spent two seasons. Razak then signed with Arab Contractors of Egypt, where he spent the next two years of his playing career. before returning to Ghana for a third spell with Kotoko. After another five years with the Ghanaian club, Razak moved to Ivorian side Africa Sports of Abidjan, where he retired two years later.

International career 
Razak was a member of the Ghana national team that competed at the 1978 African Cup of Nations as hosts of the tournament. He scored two game-winning goals, one against Zambia in the first round, and another one to defeat Tunisia 1–0 in semi-finals. His decisive goal against Tunisia has been referred to as the "Golden Goal". Ghana defeated Uganda in the final, winning their 3rd continental title. In good part due to his effort to help Ghana win the African Cup, Razak was named African Player of the Year months later, becoming the second of three Ghanaian players ever to win the award.

According to a UEFA report, Razak appeared in a total of 70 international matches for Ghana, scoring 25 goals.

Coaching career
After retiring from playing, Razak, who had become a player-coach while at Al Ain, started his coaching career, being in charge of several semi-professional Togolese clubs, before moving to Benin's AS Dragons FC de l'Ouémé.

In 2000, he had a short spell as an assistant coach of the Ghana national team. After leaving the Ghanaian side, Razak went to Mali, where he won the Malien Premiere Division and cup double with Stade Malien. The club did not lose any matches on its way to winning the title. In 2003, he was appointed the coach of Kumasi Asante Kotoko and helped the club win their first local league in ten years. He discharged of his post after the 2003–04 league season, eventually returning to Stade Malien for two additional seasons.

He also coached Real Tamale United in the Ghana Premier League from 2007 to 2009.

Achievements
In a 1999 poll held by the IFFHS to select the best footballers of the 20th Century, Razak ranked 31st among African players, and in 2007, he was selected as one of the 30 best African footballers of the previous 50 years by  CAF, through internet voting. Razak's career titles and individual honours include:

Player
Asante Kotoko
 Ghana Premier League: 1981, 1986, 1987 
 Ghanaian FA Cup: 1978 
 Ghana SWAG Cup: 1988 

New York Cosmos
 North American Soccer League season: 1978
 Trans-Atlantic Challenge Cup: 1980

Al Ain FC
 Joint League Cup: 1983 

Arab Contractors SC
 African Cup Winners' Cup: 1983

Africa Sports
 Côte d'Ivoire Premier Division: 1989 
 Côte d'Ivoire Cup: 1989 
 Coupe Houphouët-Boigny: 1989 
Ghana
 African Cup of Nations: 1978
Individual

 UAE Pro-League top scorer: 1980–81

 African Footballer of the Year: 1978
 Best AFCON Player: 1978 
 Egyptian Player of the Year: 1984, 1985

Manager 
Stade Malien

 Malien Premiere Division: 2000–01, 2002, 2005, 2005–06
 Malien Cup: 2001, 2006
Super Coupe National du Mali: 2001, 2005, 2006

 

Asante Kotoko
Ghana Premier League: 2003
SWAG Cup: 2003

 GHALCA Top 4: 2003

Individual
 Malien Premiere Division Coach of the Year: 2001, 2002, 2005, 2006
SWAG Coach of the Year: 2003

References

External links 
 
 Biography at CyberEagles
 New York Cosmos stats

1956 births
Living people
Ghanaian footballers
Ghanaian expatriate footballers
Ghana international footballers
New York Cosmos players
North American Soccer League (1968–1984) players
Al Ain FC players
Ghanaian football managers
Asante Kotoko S.C. players
Footballers from Kumasi
African Footballer of the Year winners
Al Mokawloon Al Arab SC players
Africa Sports d'Abidjan players
1978 African Cup of Nations players
1984 African Cup of Nations players
Africa Cup of Nations-winning players
Expatriate footballers in Egypt
Expatriate footballers in Ivory Coast
Expatriate footballers in the United Arab Emirates
Expatriate soccer players in the United States
Ghanaian expatriate sportspeople in Egypt
Ghanaian expatriate sportspeople in Ivory Coast
Ghanaian expatriate sportspeople in Mali
Ghanaian expatriate sportspeople in the United Arab Emirates
Ghanaian expatriate sportspeople in the United States
Ghanaian expatriate football managers
UAE Pro League players
Association football midfielders
Stade Malien managers
Egyptian Premier League players